Isaac Franklin Plantation, also known as Fairvue, is an antebellum plantation house in Gallatin, Tennessee.

Fairvue Plantation was built in 1832 by Isaac Franklin (1789–1846).  Franklin retired to be a planter after a career as a partner in the largest slave-trading firm in the South prior to the Civil War. After his death, it was inherited by his widow, Adelicia Acklen.

Fairvue was named a National Historic Landmark in 1977. The Club at Fairvue Plantation opened in 2004. In 2005, its historic landmark status was withdrawn due to development that had damaged its historic integrity.

References

External links

Houses in Sumner County, Tennessee
Houses completed in 1832
Former National Historic Landmarks of the United States
Plantation houses in Tennessee
1832 establishments in Tennessee
Historic districts on the National Register of Historic Places in Tennessee
National Register of Historic Places in Sumner County, Tennessee
Gallatin, Tennessee

Former National Register of Historic Places in Tennessee